Shixia Township is a township under the administration of Zixi County, Jiangxi, China. , it has 7 villages and one forest area residential zone under its administration.

References 

Township-level divisions of Jiangxi
Zixi County